Avazabad may refer to:
 Avazabad, Kerman
 Avazabad, Andika, Khuzestan Province
 Avazabad, Tolbozan, Masjed Soleyman County, Khuzestan Province
 Avazabad, Semnan